Delmo da Silva (9 June 1954 – 24 February 2010) was a Brazilian sprinter. He competed in the men's 400 metres at the 1976 Summer Olympics.

He was the younger brother of another sprinter, Rui da Silva.

References

1954 births
2010 deaths
Athletes (track and field) at the 1976 Summer Olympics
Brazilian male sprinters
Olympic athletes of Brazil
Athletes from Rio de Janeiro (city)
Pan American Games medalists in athletics (track and field)
Pan American Games bronze medalists for Brazil
Athletes (track and field) at the 1975 Pan American Games
Athletes (track and field) at the 1979 Pan American Games
Medalists at the 1975 Pan American Games
20th-century Brazilian people